Nevada's 21st Senate district is one of 21 districts in the Nevada Senate. It has been represented by Democrat James Ohrenschall since 2018, succeeding fellow Democrat Mark Manendo.

Geography
District 21 is based in eastern Las Vegas in Clark County, covering parts of the city proper, as well as portions of Sunrise Manor, Whitney, and Henderson.

The district overlaps with Nevada's 1st, 3rd, and 4th congressional districts, and with the 12th and 14th districts of the Nevada Assembly.

Recent election results
Nevada Senators are elected to staggered four-year terms; since 2012 redistricting, the 21st district has held elections in midterm years.

2018

2014

Federal and statewide results in District 21

References 

21
Clark County, Nevada